Baraki Rajan (Dari/Pashtun: برکی راجان) is a town within the Baraki Barak District of Logar Province, Afghanistan. Baraki Rajan lies approximately 3 km south of the town of Baraki Barak, the capital of the Baraki Barak District. Baraki Rajan is the location of the largest bazaar in the Baraki Barak District, with over 1,200 shops and businesses, with a 50+ bed hospital near the town center, making Baraki Rajan an important center for commerce within the District.

The population of mainly Tajiks  and Pashtuns is estimated at 15,000 people. The town is named after the historical Ormur tribe, also locally known as Baraki.

History
Baraki Rajan experienced some of the heaviest clashes between the Soviet forces and Afghan Mujaheddin fighters throughout the Soviet–Afghan War. Baraki Rajan based Mujaheddin would launch attacks on Soviet convoys traveling on the nearby Kabul-Gardez and Kabul-Kandahar highways, which would result in harsh reprisals from the Soviet military. Throughout the Soviet–Afghan War, the area remained an active battle ground between the Mujaheddin and the Soviet military and the Soviet-backed military of the Democratic Republic of Afghanistan.

According to a report by a Swedish committee in July 1982, in a massive operation by Soviet forces in Baraki Rajan, numerous war crimes were committed. In a three-day-long operation, villages were bombed, shops burnt and hundreds of people, including 208 resistance fighters and 25 children, were killed. Following this operation, Soviet-backed government control was never restored, not only in Baraki Rajan but the entire Baraki Barak District.

Various Mujahideen groups were active in the area with Jamiat-e Islami being the most prominent and influential in the District.

Economy

The economy of Baraki Rajan, much like the rest of Baraki Barak district is heavily dependent on agriculture. Farmers grow wheat, grains, fruits and vegetables, utilizing deep-well and canal-flood irrigation techniques. Animal husbandry is another prominent source of income for individuals in the district, who raise sheep, cattle and goats. The town center has many businesses which support the local populace, including a large textile bazaar, bakeries, groceries, mechanic shops, electronic stores, hardware stores and medical and dental facilities.

Current security situation
Baraki Rajan sits on a faultline between ethnic Tajiks and Pashtuns. There are also political factions active in the area, notably Jamiat-e-Islami and Hizb-e-Islami, with histories of mutual antagonism dating back to the Afghan civil war of the early 1990s.

Local criminal gangs have also used the instability to align themselves with the Taliban. As government power in Baraki Rejan failed late 2008, Taliban-allied men from the Pashtun village of Shahmazar to the South of Baraki Rajan began preying on the area. "They walked around with weapons robbing the people," said one, who blamed Shahmazar gunmen for the attack on the observation post. "People were happy when foreign forces stopped the crime, but now the problem is the American night raids."

As a major center of commerce and culture within the Baraki Barak district, ISAF and Afghan forces stationed in nearby Baraki Barak since late 2008 have made Baraki Rajan a major focus of their counter-insurgency efforts, and Baraki Rajan has seen an increased security element stationed in Afghan National Army and Afghan National Police elements stationed nearby.

References

Populated places in Logar Province